"Break-Up" is a song written by Charlie Rich and originally recorded by Jerry Lee Lewis, who released it as a single, with "I'll Make It All Up to You" on the other side, in 1958 on Sun Records.

Track listing

Charts

References 

1958 songs
1958 singles
Jerry Lee Lewis songs
Sun Records singles

Songs written by Charlie Rich